Minuscule 158 (in the Gregory-Aland numbering), ε 108 (Soden), is a Greek minuscule manuscript of the New Testament, on parchment. Palaeographically it has been assigned to the 11th century. It has marginalia.

Description 

The codex contains the text of the four Gospels on 236 parchment leaves (size ), with one small lacuna. The text is written in one column per page, in 20 lines per page, in very small letters. Size of the text has only 5.8 cm by 4.2 cm. The Gospel of John is ending on 21:11.

There is also another division according to the smaller Ammonian Sections (in Mark 234 – 16:9), with references to the Eusebian Canons (written below Ammonina 
Section numbers).

Text 

The Greek text of the codex is a representative of the Byzantine text-type. Hermann von Soden classified it to the textual family Kx. Kurt Aland did not place it in any Category.
According to the Claremont Profile Method it represents textual family Kx in Luke 1 and Luke 10. In Luke 20 it represents family Πa.

It lacks the text of Luke 22:43-44.

It has some readings at the margin.

History 

The manuscript was given to the Library by Pope Pius II (1458-1464). It was examined and described by Birch (about 1782), Scholz, Duchesne, and Henry Stevenson. C. R. Gregory saw it in 1886.

It is currently housed at the Vatican Library (Reg. gr. Pii II 55), at Rome.

See also 

 List of New Testament minuscules
 Biblical manuscript
 Textual criticism

References

Further reading 

 Louis Duchesne, De codicibus Mss. Graecis Pii II in Bibliotheca Alexandrino-Vaticana, Paris 1880, p. 1-3, 30.
 Henry Stevenson, Codices manuscripti Graeci Reginae Svecorum et Pii Pp. II. Bibliothecae Vaticanae, descripti praeside I.B. Cardinali Pitra, Romae 1888, p. 171.

Greek New Testament minuscules
11th-century biblical manuscripts
Manuscripts of the Vatican Library